Ronan Maher may refer to:

 Ronan Maher (hurler) (born 1995), Irish hurler
 Ronan Maher (footballer) (born 2004), Irish footballer